Troth's Fortune, also known as Troth's Farm, is a historic home in Easton, Talbot County, Maryland, United States. It is a -story, two-room deep, gambrel-roofed dwelling with a medieval style stair tower and a richly detailed interior. The house has two 20th century frame wings. It was probably built between the years 1686 and 1710, and is a well-preserved example of late 17th century Maryland vernacular architecture.

Troth's Fortune was listed on the National Register of Historic Places in 1975.

References

External links
, including photo from 1998, at Maryland Historical Trust

Houses in Talbot County, Maryland
Houses on the National Register of Historic Places in Maryland
Historic American Buildings Survey in Maryland
National Register of Historic Places in Talbot County, Maryland